"Antifragile" is a song recorded by South Korean girl group Le Sserafim for their second extended play Antifragile. It was released as the lead single by Source Music on October 17, 2022. It was written by Score (13), Megatone (13), Paulina Cerrilla, "Hitman" Bang, Shintaro Yasuda, Supreme Boi, Isabella Lovestory, Kyler Niko, Ronnie Icon, Nathalie Boone and Danke (Lalala Studio).

Background
On September 19 at midnight KST, the group officially announced the date and details of their upcoming music comeback, which would mark their first release as a five-member group after Kim Garam's departure. "Antifragile" was first heard on October 3, 2022, through a track sampler released by Source Music on different social media platforms, and was announced first through the track-list the next day. On October 17, 2022, the single was officially released alongside its music video through Source Music, 18 hours prior to the EP.

Composition and lyrics 
The second and the title track of the eponymous EP is written by Score (13), Megatone (13), Paulina Cerrilla, "Hitman" Bang, Shintaro Yasuda, Supreme Boi, Isabella Lovestory, Kyler Niko, Ronnie Icon, Nathalie Boone and Danke (Lalala Studio) with a duration of 3 minutes and 4 seconds. "Antifragile" is described as an "Afro-Latin style" pop song with a "heavy" Latin rhythm. Lyrically the song contains the message that difficult times are stimulus for growth and with this mindset, they will become stronger. It was composed in the key of B-flat minor, with a tempo of 105 beats per minute.

Reception

NME wrote that "The song tears away the cool confidence of 'Fearless' and bursts with life an infectious energy previously unseen from Le Sserafim. While the track's ever-present pipe effect borders on grating, the intense, rhythmic beats of 'Antifragile' make for such a thrilling experience that it barely even matters".

Music video 
A music video for "Antifragile" was released on October 17, 2022, at midnight KST - 18 hours before the EP's release. In the music video, Le Sserafim's members go through their daily lives while people around them panic due to an impending asteroid collision. The video ends with the group, finishing the song's choreography, getting hit by the asteroid, only to survive and brush off the dust.

Accolades

Credits and personnel 
 Score (13) – writing, production
 Megatone (13) – writing, production
 Paulina Cerrilla – writing
 "Hitman" Bang – writing
 Shintaro Yasuda – writing
 Supreme Boi – writing
 Isabella Lovestory – writing
 Kyler Niko – writing
 Ronnie Icon – writing
 Nathalie Boone – writing
 Danke (Lalala Studio) – writing

Charts

Weekly charts

Monthly charts

Year-end charts

Certifications

Release history

See also
 List of Music Bank Chart winners (2022)
 List of Show! Music Core Chart winners (2022)

References

2022 songs
Le Sserafim songs
Reggaeton songs
Korean-language songs
Hybe Corporation singles
Songs written by Bang Si-hyuk